Haywood Junction, or Great Haywood Junction, is the name of the canal junction where the Staffordshire and Worcestershire Canal terminates and meets the Trent and Mersey Canal near to the village of Great Haywood, Staffordshire, England.

History
The Trent and Mersey Canal was conceived as a way to provide a link between Liverpool and Hull, passing through the Potteries. It was authorised by an Act of Parliament in 1766, and with James Brindley acting as engineer, its  were completed eleven years later in 1777.

Brindley also built the Staffordshire and Worcestershire Canal, which was begun at much the same time as the Trent and Mersey, and was completed in 1772. It joined the Trent and Mersey Canal at Great Haywood, and was part of his Grand Cross plan to link four English estuaries: the Humber, Thames, Severn and Mersey. Haywood Junction therefore became a major transport interchange.

Location
At Great Haywood, the Trent and Mersey Canal heads north, as it continues its ascent from Derwent Mouth towards its short summit near Stoke on Trent. Haywood Lock is just to the south, while Hoo Mill Lock is a little further to the north. The River Trent runs to the west of the canal, much too small at this point to support navigation.

The Staffordshire and Worcestershire Canal heads west from the junction. The Trent and Mersey towpath is carried over it by a bridge, and almost immediately, it crosses the River Trent on an aqueduct. It follows the valley of the River Sow, which joins the Trent below the junction, and soon reaches Tixall Wide, a broad expanse of water, which, although it looks like a lake, is deep enough to allow boats to reach its edges. Shugborough Park and Hall, now owned by the National Trust, is located to the south, and Tixall Gatehouse is to the north. The canal ascends through Tixall Lock, after which is crossed the Sow on another aqueduct.
 
Shugborough Hall was begun in 1695, was extended in the 1760s, and some remodelling was carried out at the end of the eighteenth century by Samuel Wyatt. Internally, the plasterwork is magnificent, and the building is grade I listed. Many of the structures within the grounds are also listed. Tixall Lodge is a small octagonal-shaped building with a stone dome, which bears the date 1807. It is grade II listed, as is the roving bridge at the junction. Just to the south of Haywood Lock, a bridge carries a footpath from Great Haywood to Shugborough Hall. It was probably built in the 1500s, and is virtually unaltered.

See also

Canals of the United Kingdom
History of the British canal system

Bibliography

References

Canal junctions in England
Trent and Mersey Canal
Staffordshire and Worcestershire Canal
Tourist attractions in Staffordshire
Grade II listed buildings in Staffordshire